Events in 1988 in Japanese television.

Debuts

Ongoing shows
Music Fair, music (1964–present)
Mito Kōmon, jidaigeki (1969-2011)
Sazae-san, anime (1969–present)
Ōoka Echizen, jidaigeki (1970-1999)
FNS Music Festival, music (1974-present)
Panel Quiz Attack 25, game show (1975–present)
Doraemon, anime (1979-2005)
Dragon Ball, anime (1986–1989)
Saint Seiya, anime (1986–1989)
Esper Mami, anime (1987-1989)

Endings

See also
1988 in anime
List of Japanese television dramas
1988 in Japan
List of Japanese films of 1988

References